Belarus participated in the Eurovision Song Contest 2012 with the song "We Are the Heroes" written by Vladimir Karyakin and Dmitry Karyakin. The song was performed by the band Litesound. The Belarusian entry for the 2012 contest in Baku, Azerbaijan was selected through the national final Eurofest 2012, organised by the Belarusian broadcaster National State Television and Radio Company of the Republic of Belarus (BTRC). The national final was a televised production which consisted of a semi-final and a final held on 21 December 2011 and 14 February 2012, respectively. Fifteen competing acts participated in the semi-final where the top five entries qualified to the final. In the final, "All My Life" performed by Alyona Lanskaya was initially selected as the winner following the combination of votes from a jury panel and public televoting, however the entry was later disqualified due to vote rigging and replaced by runner-up "We Are the Heroes" performed by Litesound.

Belarus was drawn to compete in the second semi-final of the Eurovision Song Contest which took place on 24 May 2012. Performing during the show in position 5, "We Are the Heroes" was not announced among the top 10 entries of the second semi-final and therefore did not qualify to compete in the final. It was later revealed that Belarus placed sixteenth out of the 18 participating countries in the semi-final with 35 points.

Background 

Prior to the 2012 contest, Belarus had participated in the Eurovision Song Contest eight times since its first entry in 2004. The nation's best placing in the contest was sixth, which it achieved in 2007 with the song "Work Your Magic" performed by Dmitry Koldun. In 2011, Belarus failed to qualify to the final with the song "I Love Belarus" performed by Anastasia Vinnikova.

The Belarusian national broadcaster, National State Television and Radio Company of the Republic of Belarus (BTRC), broadcasts the event within Belarus and organises the selection process for the nation's entry. The broadcaster has used both internal selections and national finals to select the Belarusian entry for Eurovision in the past. For their 2012 entry, BTRC announced that they would organise a national final to choose Belarus' entry, the first time since 2009.

Before Eurovision

Eurofest 2012 
Eurofest 2012 was the national final format developed by BTRC to select the Belarusian entry for the Eurovision Song Contest 2012. The competition consisted of a semi-final and final held on 21 December 2011 and 14 February 2012, respectively. Both shows were broadcast on the Belarus 1, Belarus TV and Radius FM as well as online via the broadcaster's official website tvr.by. The final was also broadcast online via the official Eurovision Song Contest website eurovision.tv.

Competing entries 
Artists and composers were able to submit their applications and entries to the broadcaster between 1 November 2011 and 25 November 2011. At the closing of the deadline, 56 songs were received by the broadcaster and 115 artists applied for the competition. Auditions were held at the Youth Variety Theater in Minsk where a jury panel was tasked with selecting up to fifteen entries to proceed to the televised national final. The jury consisted of Alexander Tikhanovich (chairman of the jury, singer), Inna Afanasieva (singer), Alexey Khlestov (singer), Anatoly Yarmolenko (director of the ensemble Syabry), Nikolay Skorikov (executive producer of the TV channel Belarus 1), Yuriy Vashchuk (singer-songwriter and television presenter), Leonid Shirin (composer), Evgeny Oleinik (songwriter and producer), Alexander Mezhenny (choreographer) and Dmitry Baranov (national final project manager). Fifteen semi-finalists were selected and announced on 6 December 2011. Among the competing artists was 2011 Belarusian Eurovision contestant Anastasia Vinnikova. The competing entries were presented to the public in the lead up to the national final through special diaries that aired to promote the competition, a weekly review programme broadcast online via the broadcaster's official website and aired on Belarus 1 and Belarus TV.

Semi-final 
The televised semi-final took place on 21 December 2011 at the BTRC studios in Minsk, hosted by Denis Kurian. Prior to the semi-final, a draw for the running order took place on 16 December 2011. A 50/50 combination of votes from ten jury members made up of music professionals and public televoting selected the top five songs to qualify to the final. The jury consisted of Alexander Tikhanovich, Inna Afanasieva, Alexey Khlestov, Anatoly Yarmolenko, Nikolay Skorikov, Yuriy Vashchuk, Leonid Shirin, Evgeny Oleinik, Alexander Mezhenny and Dmitry Baranov.

In addition to the performances from the competitors, the show featured guest performances by 2011 Belarusian Junior Eurovision contestant Lidiya Zablotskaya, members of the Theatre of Modern Choreography D.O.Z.SK.I, Inna Afanasieva and Alexey Khlestov.

Final 
The televised final took place on 14 February 2012 at the Sports Palace in Minsk, hosted by Denis Kurian and Leyla Ismailova. Prior to the final, a draw for the running order took place on 24 January 2012. A 50/50 combination of votes from ten jury members made up of music professionals and public televoting resulted in a tie between "All My Life" performed by Alyona Lanskaya and "We Are the Heroes" performed by Litesound. Alyona Lanskaya was ultimately selected as the winner as she received the most votes from the public. The jury consisted of Alexander Tikhanovich, Inna Afanasieva, Alexey Khlestov, Anatoly Yarmolenko, Nikolay Skorikov, Yuriy Vashchuk, Leonid Shirin, Evgeny Oleinik, Alexander Mezhenny and Dmitry Baranov. In addition to the performances from the competitors, the show featured guest performances by 1995 Russian Eurovision contestant Philip Kirkorov, 2007 Belarusian Eurovision contestant Dmitry Koldun, 2004 and 2009 Greek Eurovision contestant Sakis Rouvas, 2012 Swiss Eurovision contestants Sinplus and former Eurovision winners Lys Assia (1956), Ruslana (2004), Marija Šerifović (2007), Alexander Rybak (2009) and Ell & Nikki (2011).

Replacement entry selection 
Following Alyona Lanskaya's win at Eurofest 2012, the song had been regarded by many international fans as "a terrible song that features child-like lyrics", which led to allegations from Belarusian press that Lanskaya had rigged the televote of the selection in her favour, which led to her "unfair" victory. Belarusian president Alexander Lukashenko ordered an immediate investigation following the rumours, confirming that Lanskaya and her producers had rigged the public televote. As a result, she was disqualified from the contest and national final runner-up "We Are the Heroes" performed by the group Litesound was announced as the new Belarusian entry for the 2012 Eurovision Song Contest on 24 February 2012.

Preparation 
On 14 March, BTRC announced that "We Are the Heroes" would undergo changes for the Eurovision Song Contest. The new version of the song was produced by Greek composer Dimitris Kontopoulos who had previously written several Eurovision entries for various countries including the Greek Eurovision Song Contest 2005 winning song "My Number One". The official music video, directed by band members Vladimir Karyakin and Dmitry Karyakin and filmed at the Lipki Aerodrome in Minsk, was released on 16 May.

At Eurovision
According to Eurovision rules, all nations with the exceptions of the host country and the "Big Five" (France, Germany, Italy, Spain and the United Kingdom) are required to qualify from one of two semi-finals in order to compete for the final; the top ten countries from each semi-final progress to the final. The European Broadcasting Union (EBU) split up the competing countries into six different pots based on voting patterns from previous contests, with countries with favourable voting histories put into the same pot. On 25 January 2012, a special allocation draw was held which placed each country into one of the two semi-finals. Belarus was placed into the second semi-final, to be held on 24 May 2012. The running order for the semi-finals was decided through another draw on 20 March 2012 and Belarus was set to perform in position 5, following the entry from Malta and before the entry from Portugal.

The two semi-finals and the final were broadcast in Belarus on the Belarus 1 with commentary by Denis Kurian. The Belarusian spokesperson, who announced the Belarusian votes during the final, was 2007 Belarusian Eurovision contestant Dmitry Koldun.

Semi-final 

Litesound took part in technical rehearsals on 4 and 8 May, followed by dress rehearsals on 11 and 12 May. This included the jury show on 11 May where the professional juries of each country watched and voted on the competing entries.

The Belarusian performance featured the members of Litesound performing on stage in a band set-up wearing black biker outfits trimmed with silver accessories, with the lead vocalist of the band Dmitry Karyakin wearing a ripped net t-shirt. During the performance, the guitarists of the band leaned back on their microphone stands into an almost horizontal position by hooking their feet into a strap on the floor, while Karyakin made use of the stage ramp by coming towards the audience. The stage colours were predominantly blue and yellow with the LED screens displaying images of nuts, bolts, cogs and wheel parts. The performance also featured pyrotechnic effects.

At the end of the show, Belarus was not announced among the top 10 entries in the second semi-final and therefore failed to qualify to compete in the final. It was later revealed that Belarus placed sixteenth in the semi-final, receiving a total of 35 points.

Voting 
Voting during the three shows involved each country awarding points from 1-8, 10 and 12 as determined by a combination of 50% national jury and 50% televoting. Each nation's jury consisted of five music industry professionals who are citizens of the country they represent. This jury judged each entry based on: vocal capacity; the stage performance; the song's composition and originality; and the overall impression by the act. In addition, no member of a national jury was permitted to be related in any way to any of the competing acts in such a way that they cannot vote impartially and independently.

Below is a breakdown of points awarded to Belarus and awarded by Belarus in the second semi-final and grand final of the contest. The nation awarded its 12 points to Ukraine in the semi-final and to Russia in the final of the contest.

Points awarded to Belarus

Points awarded by Belarus

References

2012
Countries in the Eurovision Song Contest 2012
Eurovision